The Cult of iPod is a book by Leander Kahney. It is the sequel to The Cult of Mac.
The cover of the book features an iPod click wheel shaved into a person's head.

References

Books about Apple Inc.
2005 non-fiction books
No Starch Press books